Chromepet railway station is one of the railway stations of the Chennai Beach–Chengelpet section of the Chennai Suburban Railway Network. It serves the neighbourhoods of Chromepet, Chitlapakkam, and surrounding areas.

History
Chromepet railway station lies on the Chennai Beach—Tambaram suburban section of the Chennai Suburban Railway, which was opened to traffic on 11 May 1931. The tracks were electrified on 15 November 1931. The section was converted to 25 kV AC traction on 15 January 1967.

In 1998, the railways decided to replace the level crossing at the north side of the station with a subway. In 2008, the project was re-designed as a road under bridge (RUB) with the involvement of the highways department to allow all vehicles. On 27 February 2009, construction of the  75.5-million limited-use subway began. However, the work has been stalled due to land acquisition problems.

The level crossing on the south side of the station, called "MIT Gate" was closed in January 2000 and construction of a massive ROB with four ramps on the GST road, a rotary on top and a two lane ramp extending over the tracks to the eastern side which connected with the Chitlappakam main road was commenced. After prolonged construction due to litigation by affected families, change of state government during the interim period etc., it was completed and thrown open to public in January 2006. Now known popularly as the "MIT Flyover", it serves as a vital lifeline for the populace of Nehru Nagar, Hastinapuram, Chitlapakkam and surrounding areas to easily access the GST road.

Safety
In the Guindy–Chengalpet stretch of the suburban section, which suffers from more fatal accidents of about 30 people a month compared to other stretches of the suburban network, the Chromepet–Tambaram stretch remains the deadliest with at least 15 accidents occurring every month as of 2011. Of the 181 people killed on the tracks between Guindy and Chengalpet in 2011, one-fourth were killed on the tracks between Chromepet and Tambaram stations.

The station also lacks several basic amenities.

In June 2014, an FOB connecting the Chromepet bus stand on the GST road with the Chromepet railway station was completed. It has 2 stairs on either side of the GST road, a slope on one of those sides, and 2 working escalators on both sides for climbing the FOB instead of taking the pain to climb stairs. It connects the existing FOB of the Chromepet railway station.

See also

 Chennai Suburban Railway
 Railway stations in Chennai

References

External links
Chromepet railway station at Indiarailinfo.org

Stations of Chennai Suburban Railway
Railway stations in Chennai
Railway stations in Kanchipuram district